Sister Charity (Real name Kobutungi Charity) is a western Ugandan musical artist and TV personality. She presents the morning show (Sisimuka) on TV West in Mbarara, Uganda. She is popularly known for her 2001 hit song Grade. She sings mostly in her native language Runyankole and then Luganda and English. She was listed among the best artists from Western Uganda alongside Juliana Kanyomozi, Ray G, Angella Katatumba and Toniks on Hi Pipo.

Career
She started singing with a group called TYE (Train the youth effort) band in 2000. Charity joined Rays Band owned by Rasta Charz, with which she performs. She has also contributed to the Am A Ugandan project by bringing its message in a song titled” Ndi Omunya Uganda” a song that she collaborated with Santana her co-presenter on TV West and also a musician.

Sister Charity has nine albums and these include Grade, Omufumbo, Pound, Choice, Nkyalimbooko, Jambuura and many others.  Most of these songs are in her local language (Runyankole) minus some few which are in Luganda and English.

She has shared stage with Uganda's biggest musicians like Nicky Jizzy Dr. Jose Chameleone, Prossy Kankunda, Gravity Omutujju and many others

in 2011, Sister Charity was announced as a presenter for the morning show (Sisimuka) on Vision Group's TV West in Mbarara where she works until now.

Personal life
She was born 7 June 1980 to Mr. and Mrs. Enoth Buriita in a family of 6 children and she is the second last born. She studied from Rweibaare Primary school, Rweibaare Secondary school, went to Train The youth Effort (TYE) for higher level and later joined Mbarara Business School (MBI) where she attained a UNEB Dip in Accountancy. She married her mentor Rasta Charz but divorced in 2013 citing disrespect in their relationship.

Discography
Grade
Choice
Nsasira
Pound
Nkyalimbooko
Omufumbo
Ekyoyine
Zaara with Rub'een

Awards
Ever Green - Western artist of the year 2014
PAM Awards (Pearl Of Africa Music Awards) - Best Western Artiste of the year 2005 - Grade
Radio West Annual music festival - Best artist of the year 2004
Radio West Annual music festival - Best artist of the year 2003 
Bell lager achiever award western region, 2003
Radio West Annual music festival - Best artist of the year 2002

References

External links

 GOtv turns on Mbarara

Living people
People from Sheema District
21st-century Ugandan women singers
People from Mbarara District
Ugandan television presenters
https://www.howwebiz.ug/SisterCharity/biography

1980 births
Ugandan women television presenters